Queen Yongsin of the Danju Han clan (Hangul: 용신왕후 한씨, 容信王后 韓氏; d. 1036) or known as Princess Consort Jeongsin was a Korean queen consort as the first wife of Jeongjong of Goryeo.

Biography

Life
The future Queen Yongsin was born as the daughter of Han-Jo (한조) and the younger sister of Han-Gyu (한규), also the older sister of her future husband's second wife, Queen Yongui. Not like the other Goryeo queens, she had no any blood-relation with Jeongjong from their initial family and this marriage was just a noble and royal family.

They were married while Jeongjong was still "Prince Pyeongyang" (평양군, 平壤君) and after his ascension to the throne, she became his queen consort and given royal title as Princess Yeonheung (연흥궁주, 延興宮主).

In 1035, she bore Jeongjong a son named Wang-Hyeong (왕형), which she then honoured as Gracious Consort Han (혜비 한씨, 惠妃 韓氏; Hye-Bi) and Princess Consort Jeongsin (정신왕비, 定信王妃) not long after her first promoted.

Meanwhile, in 1036, the Queen passed away and buried in "Hyeolleung Tomb" (현릉, 玄陵) with received her full Posthumous name in 1048 (2nd year reign of Munjong of Goryeo).

Posthumous name
In October 1056 (10th year reign of King Munjong), name Jeong-ui (정의, 定懿) was added.
In April 1140 (18th year reign of King Injong), name Myeong-dal (명달, 明達) was added.
In October 1253 (40th year reign of King Gojong), name Hui-mok (희목, 禧穆) was added to her Posthumous name too.

References

External links
Queen Yongsin in Encykorea .
용신왕후 on Doosan Encyclopedia .

Royal consorts of the Goryeo Dynasty
Korean queens consort
Year of birth unknown
1036 deaths
11th-century Korean people
11th-century Korean women